Bank of German Labor, Inc. was a financial institution of the German Labor Front (DAF). Founded in 1924 as the Bank of Workers, Employees, and Civil Servants (Bank der Arbeiter, Angestellten und Beamten AG) by organizations representing these groups, the Berlin-based bank was taken over by the DAF and renamed after the Nazi government banned all independent trade unions on May 2, 1933.

Bibliography
Christian Zentner, Friedemann Bedürftig (1991). The Encyclopedia of the Third Reich. Macmillan, New York.

External links
 

1924 establishments in Germany
Companies based in Berlin
Companies of Prussia
Organizations established in 1924